Khalvashi is a Georgian surname. Notable people with the surname include:

Kibar Khalvashi (born 1963), Georgian businessman
Sopho Khalvashi (born 1986), Georgian musician of Laz heritage

Georgian-language surnames